Barclay Harding Warburton may refer to:

Barclay Harding Warburton I (1866–1954), American publisher
Barclay Harding Warburton II (1898–1936), American socialite, farmer, and aviator
Barclay Harding Warburton III (1922–1983), founder of the American Sail Training Association
Barclay Harding Warburton IV, son of Barclay Harding Warburton III, founder of West Indies Management Company